This list of episodes of Conan details information on the 2014 episodes of Conan, a television program on TBS hosted by Conan O'Brien. Between March 31–April 3, Conan taped four shows at the Majestic Theatre in Dallas, Texas.

2014

January

February

March

April

May

June

July

August

September

October

NOTES: The October 28 episode included a joke scene where regular The Basic Cable Band drummer James Wormworth had supposedly gone missing, so Max Weinberg volunteered to fill in.  This marks Weinberg's first return to Conan since the end of The Tonight Show with Conan O'Brien.

November

December

References

Episodes (2014)
Conan episodes
Conan episodes
Conan